Chaser (April 28, 2004 – July 23, 2019) was a Border Collie with the largest tested memory of any non-human animal. Chaser worked with Professor John W. Pilley, at his home in Spartanburg, South Carolina, from eight weeks old, until Pilley's death in June 2018. Pilley spent that time training her in a formal research project. Chaser could identify and retrieve 1,022 toys by name. 

Pilley's wife, Sally, had given Chaser to him as a 76th birthday present. "She came to me when she was eight weeks old and had been with us ever since", she said. "We were playing with her out in the front yard one day, and a red Jeep came flying past us and she went flying out after the car, so we decided to name her Chaser."

In November 2021, Chaser was named the official mascot of Spartanburg Community College, the first mascot in the college's history.

Background
Chaser had the largest tested memory of any non-human animal. She was bred by Wayne West at his Flint Hill Farms in Pauline, South Carolina. She was taught by her owner, Wofford College Professor Emeritus of Psychology John W. Pilley, with the formal research published in Elsevier's journals Behavioural Processes and Learning and Motivation.

Memory study 
Chaser could identify and retrieve 1,022 toys by name, which was the result of a years-long research effort initiated by Pilley on June 28, 2004. Pilley documents the following milestones as Chaser’s vocabulary grew over time: 50 words at 5 months, 200 words at 7.5 months, 700 words at 1.5 years, and 1,000+ at 3 years.

Chaser began to understand that objects have names at five months of age. At this point, she became able to pair a novel object with a novel name in one trial, although rehearsal was necessary to log it into her long term memory. She recognized common nouns such as house, tree, and ball, as well as adverbs, verbs and prepositional objects. Based on that learning, she and her owner and trainer Pilley continued her training, demonstrating her ability to understand sentences involving multiple elements of grammar, and to learn new behaviors by imitation.

Chaser could also learn new words by "inferential reasoning by exclusion", that is, inferring the name of a new object by excluding objects whose names she already knew.

In popular culture 
Chaser and Professor Pilley were featured in the documentary film, Seniors: A Dogumentary, from director Gorman Bechard. The film premiered in March 2020 at the Belcourt Theatre in Nashville, and was released on DVD and pay-per-view in September 2020. Sharon Knolle in MoviePaws called it "a heartwarming celebration of these sweet animals and the people who make sure their last years are spent with a lot of love and comfort."

The two were also spotlighted in a 60 Minutes piece exploring canine intelligence that aired in 2014.

Deaths 
On June 17, 2018, John W. Pilley died in Spartanburg, South Carolina. He was recognized as both a professor and scientist for his research in canine cognition, the latest and most prominent example being with Chaser. 

After Pilley's death, Chaser lived with Pilley's wife Sally, and their adult daughters, Deb Pilley Bianchi and Robin Pilley. A year later, on July 23, 2019, Chaser died from natural causes, at the age of 15 years, in her home in Spartanburg, South Carolina. In a Facebook post, the family wrote a tribute to Chaser. "We... were with her as she passed. It was peaceful, beautiful, quiet. She had been doing really well and then a couple of weeks ago, she started going downhill very quickly... She is buried with the other Pilley dogs, sprinkled with John Pilley's ashes."

Deb Pilley Bianchi, who was involved in training and caring for Chaser, is completing a book which she and John Pilley were in the process of writing before he died, with a working title of "A World of Chasers".

See also
Alex, a grey parrot known for intelligent use of speech
Ayumu, a chimpanzee who can remember number sequences better than university students
Betsy, a border collie known to understand over 340 words
Rico, a border collie who was reported to understand over 200 words
Koko, a gorilla who learned sign language
Kanzi, a bonobo who learned language through keyboard lexigrams
List of individual dogs
Human-animal communication
Talking birds, including a budgerigar named Puck

References

External links
Chaser The Border Collie:The Smartest Dog In The World?
CBS 60 Minutes The Smartest Dog in the World
Chaser the Dog Shows Off Her Smarts to Neil deGrasse Tyson
Nova Science Now : How Smart Are Dogs? Chaser with Neil deGrasse Tyson (at 1:50 and 10:43)

2004 animal births
2019 animal deaths
Individual dogs in the United States